The Molodo (Muolada) is a river in Bulunsky District, Sakha Republic, Russia. It is a major left tributary of the Lena.

The banks of the Molodo are not inhabited. River sediments contain alluvial gold and diamonds.

Geography
The Molodo originates at the confluence of the Molodo-Khangas-Anabyla and the Molodo-Unga-Anabyla in the Central Siberian Plateau, western part of Bulunsky District. From the source it flows southwest, subsequently south, and accepts the Khastakh from the left. Downstream of the mouth of the Khastakh the Molodo turns east, accepts the Daldyn from the left and turns southeast. Below the mouth of the Syungyude the Molodo turns northwest, accepts the Muogdan from the left and turns right.

The drainage basin of the Molodo includes the southwestern part of Bulunsky District and the northwestern part of Zhigansky District.

Tributaries 

Geology
A geological outcrop along the river ("Molodo river section") was a candidate for the definition of the base of Wuliuan. If chosen, the stage would have been named Molodian, after the river.

See also
List of rivers of Russia

References

Rivers of the Sakha Republic